Xipu may refer to:

Xipu Town (Zhangzhou), town of Dongshan County, Fujian, China
Rolly Xipu (born 1952), South African boxer